Sushama Sen (born 25 April 1889, date of death unknown) was an Indian politician. She was elected to the Lok Sabha, the lower house of the Parliament of India from the Bhagalpur South, Bihar as a member of the Indian National Congress.

References

External links
 Official biographical sketch in Parliament of India website

Indian National Congress politicians
1889 births
Year of death missing
India MPs 1952–1957
Lok Sabha members from Bihar
Women members of the Lok Sabha
Indian National Congress politicians from Bihar